Fieldon may refer to:

Fieldon, Illinois
Fieldon Township, Minnesota